Mouthparts may refer to:
 The parts of a mouth
 Arthropod mouthparts
 Insect mouthparts